The compound perbromic acid is the inorganic compound with the formula HBrO4. It is an oxoacid of bromine.  Perbromic acid is unstable and cannot be formed by displacement of chlorine from perchloric acid, as periodic acid is prepared; it can only be made by protonation of the perbromate ion.

Perbromic acid is a strong acid and strongly oxidizing.  It is the most unstable of the halogen(VII) oxoacids. It decomposes rapidly on standing to bromic acid and oxygen. It reacts with bases to form perbromate salts.

See also
Perbromate

Further reading
 

Halogen oxoacids
Hydrogen compounds
Oxidizing agents
Oxidizing acids
Perbromates